Herfast or Arfast (died 1084) was the first Lord Chancellor of Norman England. He was also Bishop of Elmham and later Bishop of Thetford, after he moved his see there.

Life
Born in Normandy, Herfast joined William the Conqueror during the Norman Conquest of England and was appointed head of the royal writing office after the Battle of Hastings. He was Lord Chancellor of England from 1068 to 1070.

After serving as Lord Chancellor, he was consecrated Bishop of Elmham in 1070, but about 27 May 1072 he moved the see to Thetford, thus becoming Bishop of Thetford. He attempted to move his diocese to Bury St. Edmunds Abbey, with the assistance of Herman the Archdeacon, but the proposal was opposed by its abbot, Baldwin. Herfast finally lost in the King's Court in 1081 and was fined a crippling amount, which was unpaid when he died.

He signed the Accord of Winchester in 1072.

Bishop Herfast died in 1084.  He was a married bishop, and his sons held land in Norfolk at the time of Domesday Book in 1086.

References

Further reading

External links
 

Year of birth unknown
1085 deaths
Lord chancellors of England
Bishops of Elmham
Bishops of Thetford (ancient)
11th-century English Roman Catholic bishops
Normans in England